"Te Boté" (English: "I Dumped You") is a song recorded by Puerto Rican rappers Nio García, Darell and Casper Mágico. The song was released by Flow La Movie Inc. as a single on December 1, 2017, for digital download and streaming. On April 13, 2018, a remixed version of "Te Boté" featuring American artist Nicky Jam and Puerto Rican artists Bad Bunny and Ozuna was released as single. An English remix of the song by Conor Maynard featuring Anth was released on May 19, 2018. Another remix entitled "Te Boté II", by Casper Magico, Nio Garcia and Cosculluela, featuring Wisin & Yandel and Jennifer Lopez (as JLo), was released on December 18, 2018.

Music video
The music video for "Te Boté" premiered on November 30, 2017, on Flow La Movie YouTube channel.

Track listing

Charts

Weekly charts

Year-end charts

Certifications

Release history

Te Boté (Remix)

On April 13, 2018, a remix of the song featuring American artist Nicky Jam and Puerto Rican artists Bad Bunny, and Ozuna was made available worldwide as a single.  It was produced by Puerto Rican producers Young Mvrtino, Kronix Magical, and Shorty Complete.

Music video
The music video for remix of "Te Boté" premiered on April 11, 2018, on Flow La Movie's YouTube channel. As of August 2020, the video has received more than 2.2 billion views and is one of the site's 50 most-viewed videos.

Charts

Weekly charts

Year-end charts

Decade-end charts

All-time charts

Certifications

Release history

Te Boté II

"Te Boté II", by Casper Magico, Nio Garcia and Cosculluela, featuring Wisin & Yandel and Jennifer Lopez (as JLo), was released on December 18, 2019 by Flow La Movie Inc. Lopez sings the first verse in English, with the rest of the remix sung in Spanish.

Certifications

See also
List of Billboard number-one Latin songs of 2018

References

2017 songs
2017 singles
Number-one singles in Spain
Bad Bunny songs
Nicky Jam songs
Ozuna (singer) songs
Jennifer Lopez songs
Wisin songs
Yandel songs